April L. Sargent (born April 1, 1968) is an American former ice dancer. Skating with Russ Witherby, she won the gold medal at the U.S. Figure Skating Championships in 1992 and competed in the Winter Olympics that year. She currently coaches at the Philadelphia Skating Club & Humane Society.

Sargent was born in Ogdensburg, New York, and was formerly an ISU Technical Specialist.

Results
(with John D'Amelio)

(with Russ Witherby)

References

Navigation

1968 births
Living people
People from Ogdensburg, New York
American female ice dancers
Olympic figure skaters of the United States
Figure skaters at the 1992 Winter Olympics
International Skating Union technical specialists
Competitors at the 1990 Goodwill Games
21st-century American women